Cecília Esztergályos (born 26 January 1943) is a Hungarian actress. She appeared in more than seventy films since 1962.

Selected filmography

References

External links 

1943 births
Living people
Hungarian film actresses
Actresses from Budapest